Zoo Doctor: My Mom the Vet (Tierärztin Dr. Mertens) is a German television series.

External links
 

2006 German television series debuts
2010s German television series
German-language television shows
Das Erste original programming